In mathematics, in the area of statistical analysis, the bispectrum is a statistic used to search for nonlinear interactions.

Definitions
The Fourier transform of the second-order cumulant, i.e., the autocorrelation function, is the traditional power spectrum. 

The Fourier transform of C3(t1, t2) (third-order cumulant-generating function) is called the bispectrum or bispectral density.

Calculation
Applying the convolution theorem allows fast calculation of the bispectrum: , where  denotes the Fourier transform of the signal, and  its conjugate.

Applications

Bispectrum and bicoherence may be applied to the case of non-linear interactions of a continuous spectrum of propagating waves in one dimension.

Bispectral measurements have been carried out for EEG signals monitoring. It was also shown that bispectra characterize differences between families of musical instruments.

In seismology, signals rarely have adequate duration for making sensible bispectral estimates from time averages.

Bispectral analysis describes observations made at two wavelengths. It is often used by scientists to analyze elemental makeup of a planetary atmosphere by analyzing the amount of light reflected and received through various color filters. By combining and removing two filters, much can be gleaned from only two filters. Through modern computerized interpolation, a third virtual filter can be created to recreate true color photographs that, while not particularly useful for scientific analysis, are popular for public display in textbooks and fund raising campaigns.

Bispectral analysis can also be used to analyze interactions between wave patterns and tides on Earth.

A form of bispectral analysis called the bispectral index is applied to EEG waveforms to monitor depth of anesthesia.

Biphase (phase of polyspectrum) can be used for detection of phase couplings, noise reduction of polharmonic (particularly, speech ) signal analysis.

Generalizations
Bispectra fall in the category of higher-order spectra, or polyspectra and provide supplementary information to the power spectrum. The third order polyspectrum (bispectrum) is the easiest to compute, and hence the most popular.
  
A statistic defined analogously is the bispectral coherency or bicoherence.

Trispectrum
The Fourier transform of C4 (t1, t2, t3) (fourth-order cumulant-generating function) is called the trispectrum or trispectral density.

The trispectrum T(f1,f2,f3) falls into the category of higher-order spectra, or polyspectra, and provides supplementary information to the power spectrum. The trispectrum is a three-dimensional construct. The symmetries of the trispectrum allow a much reduced support set to be defined, contained within the following vertices, where 1 is the Nyquist frequency. (0,0,0) (1/2,1/2,-1/2) (1/3,1/3,0) (1/2,0,0) (1/4,1/4,1/4). The plane containing the points (1/6,1/6,1/6) (1/4,1/4,0) (1/2,0,0) divides this volume into an inner and an outer region. A stationary signal will have zero strength (statistically) in the outer region. The trispectrum support is divided into regions by the plane identified above and by the (f1,f2) plane. Each region has different requirements in terms of the bandwidth of signal required for non-zero values.

In the same way that the bispectrum identifies contributions to a signal's skewness as a function of frequency triples, the trispectrum identifies contributions to a signal's kurtosis as a function of frequency quadruplets.

The trispectrum has been used to investigate the domains of applicability of maximum kurtosis phase estimation used in the deconvolution of seismic data to find layer structure.

References

Further reading

HOSA - Higher Order Spectral Analysis Toolbox: A MATLAB toolbox for spectral and polyspectral analysis, and time-frequency distributions. The documentation explains polyspectra in great detail.

Complex analysis
Integral transforms
Fourier analysis
Time series
Nonlinear time series analysis
Statistical signal processing